Cornelia Schmidt-Liermann (born in Buenos Aires, 6 November 1963) is an Argentine lawyer and politician. A member of Republican Proposal (PRO), she was a National Deputy for the City of Buenos Aires from 2011 to 2019.

Biography 
She was born in Buenos Aires on 6 November 1963. She is a German Argentine. She obtained her Bachelor of Science and Letters from the Goethe-Institut in Buenos Aires. In addition to Spanish, she also speaks German and English.

In 1987 she graduated in law and as a procurator from the University of Buenos Aires. A year after this she followed with postgraduate courses at the University of Hamburg in the then Federal Republic of Germany, with a specialization in conflict of laws and new forms of commercial contracting.

Publications 
"Press conferences in Argentina. Current situation and alternative tools for the dialogue between journalists and government officials" (The Crujíadic, 2009)

References 

20th-century Argentine lawyers
Argentine people of German descent
1963 births
Republican Proposal politicians
Politicians from Buenos Aires
University of Buenos Aires alumni
University of Hamburg alumni
Living people
Argentine women lawyers
Members of the Argentine Chamber of Deputies elected in Buenos Aires
Women members of the Argentine Chamber of Deputies
Commanders Crosses of the Order of Merit of the Federal Republic of Germany
21st-century Argentine lawyers